Kevin Henry Chaurand Peasland (born 29 March 1995) is a Mexican professional footballer who plays as forward for Colima F.C.

References

External links
 

1995 births
Living people
Association football forwards
Mexican footballers
Club Celaya footballers
Club Necaxa footballers
Lobos BUAP footballers
Murciélagos FC footballers
Club Atlético Zacatepec players
Ascenso MX players
Liga Premier de México players
Tercera División de México players
Mexican people of English descent
Mexican people of French descent
Mexican people of Scottish descent
People from Celaya
Footballers from Guanajuato